Historicus is Latin for historical.

As a pseudonym, it may also refer to:

 Benjamin Franklin (1706–1790), American polymath and statesman
 David McKee Wright (1869–1928), Irish-born poet and journalist
 Fred Rhodes (1877–1964), Australian journalist and author